The Ministry of Primary Resources and Tourism (MPRT; , KSSUP) is a cabinet-level ministry in the government of Brunei which oversees agriculture, fishing, forestry and tourism in the country. It is currently led by a minister and the incumbent is Abdul Manaf Metussin, who took office since 7 June 2022. The ministry is headquartered in Bandar Seri Begawan.

Background 
The ministry was previously known as the Ministry of Industry and Primary Resources (MIPR) until the renaming to its present name to reflect functional restructuring, in which oversight for the petroleum and non-primary industries has been transferred, at that time to the Prime Minister's Office. It is also to reflect the emphasis on the development of tourism industry.

Organisation 
The ministry manages the following departments:
 Agriculture and Agrifood Department
 Department of Fisheries
 Forestry Department
 Tourism Development Department

Budget 
In the 2022–23 fiscal year, the ministry has been allocated a budget of B$96 million, a 40 percent increase from the previous year.

Ministers

Notes

References

External links 
 

Primary Resources and Tourism
Brunei
Brunei
Brunei
Brunei
Agricultural organisations based in Brunei